A Fighting Chance is a 2014 memoir by the American academic and senior Massachusetts United States Senator Elizabeth Warren.  The book details Warren's life from her upbringing in Oklahoma City to her unexpectedly successful bid for the United States Senate in 2012.

Content
The main theme of Warren's book centers on the values of hard work and the benefits to be reaped from never giving up. In it, she describes how her experiences as a child affected her worldview of things, especially in regards to the financial status of middle class America. Warren also discusses how, over the decades, big banks and transnational corporations have managed to control almost every corridor of Washington "with armies of lobbyists and lawyers" at their beck and call.

Sales
Warren's book has garnered praise from a number of sources and sold better than some of her Republican counterparts. The release of the book prompted pundits to say that she is leaving open the possibility to run for president in 2016 or even 2020, in spite of the fact that she repeatedly declared that she is not running. More than 65,000 copies were sold by the third quarter of 2014, eventually leading to a paperback release one year later.

Critical reception

A Fighting Chance was praised by Amy Chozick of The New York Times, who wrote, "The book is a potent mix of memoir and policy that makes politics seem like a necessary evil, and yet it's impossible to read Warren's story without thinking about her meteoric rise in the Democratic Party and those Warren groupies on Connecticut Avenue. That makes the aw-shucks, I-just-stumbled-into-the-Senate anecdotes that propel her narrative feel inevitably like the savvy (critics would say self-serving) story lines that would play so well at an Elks Club in Iowa."  Maura J. Casey of The Washington Post observed that "the book's message is that one person can make a difference, but change is painfully slow, uneven and the work of a lifetime. After reading this book, it is comforting to know that Elizabeth Warren, with her passion, anger and bluntness, will not be silenced."  A Fighting Chance was also praised by John Cassidy of The New York Review of Books, who remarked, "If Warren has a big idea, this is it: the conception of society as an organic, mutually dependent whole."  Writing for The New Yorker, the historian Jill Lepore compared the book favorably to Louis Brandeis's 1914 book Other People's Money and How the Bankers Use It, writing:  A Fighting Chance was similarly praised by Michael Jonas of The Boston Globe and David Lauter of the Los Angeles Times.

Conversely, Mary Kissel of The Wall Street Journal was heavily critical of the book, describing it as "the story of how a middle-class girl rose to the Senate—and came to see the market economy that gave her the chance as 'rigged.'"  The book was similarly attacked by Christopher Bedford for the conservative magazine National Review, who perceived it as a campaign book for Warren's anticipated entry into the 2016 presidential election. Ultimately however, Warren ended up endorsing Hillary Clinton during the last week of the Democratic primary.

References

2014 non-fiction books
American memoirs
Books by Elizabeth Warren
English-language books
Metropolitan Books books
Political memoirs